Geoffrey Barrow Dowling (9 August 1891-1 June1976), was a consultant dermatologist at St Thomas's Hospital and St John's Hospital for Diseases of the Skin, who encouraged the study of histopathology and demonstrated the beneficial effects of large doses of calciferol in the treatment of lupus vulgaris in 1945. In addition, he worked with Walter Freudenthal on dermatomyositis and scleroderma. He established The Dowling Club in the 1940s.

References 

1891 births
1976 deaths
British dermatologists